Leendert "Leen" Verbeek (born 5 March 1954) is a Dutch politician serving as the King's Commissioner of Flevoland since 2008. A member of the Labour Party (PvdA), he previously served as Mayor of Purmerend from 2003 to 2008.

Verbeek spent his early years in Eindhoven. After the MULO (current-day VMBO) and a year of high school in the United States, he attended the Academy for Educational Labour in Baarn. He then started to work as a youth worker in Leiden.

Ten years later Verbeek started his political career through political institutions, ending up as an alderman in Houten (1989–96). He was appointed Mayor of Purmerend seven years after he left the political sphere. In between he was director of a self-created company.

On 18 December 2007, it was announced that Verbeek was a candidate for Mayor of Eindhoven along with Rob van Gijzel. A referendum was held on 23 January 2008, in which Verbeek scored 33% of the votes, but because the required number of voters was not met, the referendum was nullified and the decision was made in-house, which resulted in Van Gijzel being appointed Mayor of Eindhoven. Verbeek was replaced by Fons Hertog as Mayor of Purmerend in November 2008, as Verbeek was appointed the Queen's Commissioner (in 2013 the title changed to King's Commissioner) for the province of Flevoland.

References 
  Parlement.com biography

1954 births
Living people
Aldermen in Utrecht (province)
Dutch civil servants
Dutch social workers
King's and Queen's Commissioners of Flevoland
Labour Party (Netherlands) politicians
Mayors in North Holland
People from Eindhoven
People from Houten
People from Leiderdorp
People from Purmerend